Purgatory Resort is a ski resort located in the San Juan Mountains of Southwest Colorado, 25 miles (42 km) north of the town of Durango. 
Established in 1965, Purgatory offers 105 trails, including 5 terrain parks, over 1,500 skiable acres, and 12 lifts, including one six-person and two high speed quad lifts. Average annual snowfall is 260 inches per year, and artificial snow is produced on approximately one-fifth of the mountain.

Facilities
Facilities at the resort include condos that are rented out by their owners to vacationing tourists, a nightclub/bar at the bottom of the ski slopes by the chair lifts, a shuttle that goes back and forth from the resort to the nearby town of Durango, and a ski school with "bunny slopes".  One of the more unusual features of the resort is an urgent care clinic, staffed by mid-level health care providers from the nearby town of Durango, Colorado.  The on-site urgent care clinic is available anytime the slopes are open, and treats mostly ski related injuries.  The Purgatory ski patrol takes injured skiers off the mountain directly to the clinic, expediting treatment and eliminating the need for patients to wait for an ambulance to respond from nearby Durango, Colorado.

References

External links
Purgatory Resort Official site
3dSkiMap of Purgatory at Durango Mountain Resort

Ski areas and resorts in Colorado
Buildings and structures in La Plata County, Colorado
San Juan Mountains (Colorado)
Tourist attractions in La Plata County, Colorado